In cryptography, a pseudorandom ensemble is a family of variables meeting the following criteria:

Let  be a uniform ensemble
and  be an ensemble. The ensemble  is called pseudorandom if  and 
are indistinguishable in polynomial time.

References 
 Goldreich, Oded (2001). Foundations of Cryptography: Volume 1, Basic Tools.  Cambridge University Press. . Fragments available at the  author's web site.

Algorithmic information theory
Pseudorandomness
Cryptography